Margaret of Baden (1431 – 24 October 1457) was a Margravine of Baden by birth and by marriage Margravine of Brandenburg-Ansbach and Brandenburg-Kulmbach.  She was the daughter of Jacob, Margrave of Baden-Baden, and his wife Catherine of Lorraine.

In 1446, Margaret married Albert of Brandenburg, the future Albert III Achilles, Elector of Brandenburg, in Heilsbronn.  Margaret died before he succeeded to the Electorate of Brandenburg, thus never served as Electress. Their marriage produced three sons and three daughters:
 Ursula (1450–1508)
 married in 1467 Duke Henry I of Münsterberg-Oels (1448-1498)
 Elisabeth (1451–1524)
 married in 1467 Duke Eberhard II of Württemberg (1447-1504)
 Margaret (1453–1509), abbess of the Poor Clares convent at Hof from 1476
 John Cicero (1455–1499), Elector of Brandenburg

Margaret died in Ansbach in 1457 shortly after her husband acquired the Margraviate of Brandenburg-Kulmbach.

|-

Margravines of Brandenburg-Ansbach
House of Hohenzollern
1431 births
1457 deaths
15th-century German people
15th-century German women
House of Zähringen
Daughters of monarchs